Balsha Island is an ice-free island in the Dunbar group off the northwest coast of Varna Peninsula, Livingston Island in the South Shetland Islands, Antarctica. Extending , surface area . The area was visited by early 19th century sealers.

The island is named after the settlement of Balsha in western Bulgaria.

Location

Bulgarian topographic survey by Tangra 2004/05 expedition. British mapping in 1968, Chilean in 1971, Argentine in 1980, Bulgarian in 2005 and 2009.

See also 
 Composite Gazetteer of Antarctica.
 List of Antarctic islands south of 60° S
 SCAR
 Territorial claims in Antarctica

References

External links
 Balsha Island. SCAR Composite Gazetteer of Antarctica.
 Bulgarian Antarctic Gazetteer. Antarctic Place-names Commission. (details in Bulgarian, basic data in English)

External links
 Balsha Island. Copernix satellite image

Islands of Livingston Island
Bulgaria and the Antarctic